Shahzadeh Abdollah (also Romanized as Shāhzādeh ‘Abdollāh) is a village in Seydun-e Shomali Rural District, Seydun District, Bagh-e Malek County, Khuzestan Province, Iran. At the 2006 census, its population was 48, in 9 families.

References 

Populated places in Bagh-e Malek County